Çıraqlı (also, Chirakhly, Chyragly, and Chyrakhly) is a village and municipality in the Dashkasan Rayon of Azerbaijan.  It has a population of 173.

References 

Populated places in Dashkasan District